The RG-31 Nyala is a 4×4 multi-purpose mine-resistant ambush protected infantry mobility vehicle manufactured in South Africa by Land Systems OMC (the division of Denel SOC LTD, located in Benoni, South Africa) and in Turkey by FNSS Defence Systems.  It is based on the Mamba APC of TFM Industries.

The RG-31 has become the multi-purpose vehicle of choice of the UN and other peacekeeping and security forces. It is finding favour with non-governmental organisations requiring a vehicle with a non-aggressive appearance to protect their personnel against land mines.

Design
The RG-31 is built from a V-shaped all-steel welded armor monocoque hull and high suspension, typical of South African mine protected vehicles, providing excellent small-arms and mine blast protection.  The vehicle is designed to resist a blast equivalent to two TM-57 anti-tank mines detonating simultaneously.  The RG-31 is classified by the United States Department of Defense as a category 1 Mine Resistant Ambush Protected (MRAP) vehicle.

The vehicle accommodates a crew ranging from 5 to 10 depending on mission needs, depending on model. Dismounting is provided via a large air actuated rear door and two front doors, also air actuated.

In July 2016, the Letterkenny Army Depot in Pennsylvania rolled out the latest variant of the RG-31, with improvements including an engine upgrade from 275 to 300 hp, a transmission upgrade, independent suspension, 360-degree spotlights for night visibility, and an armored gunner's hatch. The depot is scheduled to produce 929 improved RG-31s through 2020.

Production history

Variants
Variants come in either an armoured personnel carrier (APC) or utility vehicle (cargo) configuration.
 RG-31 Mk3A – based on Mamba APC
 RG-31 Mk5
 RG-31 Mk5E – An extended Mk5 with larger passenger/cargo capacity and superior blast and ballistic protection.
 RG-31 Mk6E – Enhanced crew protection
 RG-31 Charger – US Army version of the Mk3 with a Detroit Diesel engine and Mk5 with a Cummins engine
 RG-31 Sabre – cargo version
 RG-31M – features a military wiring harness, central tire inflation and several other new characteristics. This vehicle has a crew of 5.
 RG-31 Agrab; Mortar carrier version with SRAMS (Super Rapid Advanced Mortar System).

Operators

:
Burundi Army
12x RG-31 Nyala
:
Canadian Forces
75 RG-31 Mk3 with Protector (RWS) Remote Weapon Station; replaced by Textron Tactical Armoured Patrol Vehicle
London Police Service
1x RG-31 Mk3A, currently used by the Emergency Response Team
Durham Regional Police Service
1x RG-31 Mk3A, Tactical Rescue Vehicle donated by General Dynamics to the Tactical Response Unit
:
National Army of Colombia
4× RG-31 Nyala
: 150× RG-31 Mk5E Nyala with Samson remote Weapon Station (+ option for 30 more) already deployed in Lebanon and Afghanistan.
: 5× RG-31 Nyala
: 1× RG-31 Nyala

: 76× RG-31 Nyala

: 7× RG-31 Nyala Mk5E, currently used by the Umbutfo Eswatini Defence Force (UEDF).
: 253× customized RG-31 Mk5
: 30× RG-31 Nyala
:
US SOCOM
50× Mk5A1S
US Army
148× RG-31 Mk3 Charger,
257× Mk5A1
111× Mk5E
USMC
12× Mk5A's (MRAP Cat I)
1385× Mk5E's (MRAP Cat II)
Academi

Combat history

Afghanistan – Canada, (including 5 leased to Netherlands) (ISAF), United States, and Spain
Bosnia and Herzegovina – UNPROFOR
Ethiopia / Eritrea – Canada
Georgia –- UN
Iraq – United States
Colombian Armed Conflict
Ivorian Civil War
Ivory Coast – UNOCI
Kosovo – KFOR
Lebanon – UNIFIL
Uganda - Uganda People's Defence Forces
Yemen - United Arab Emirates as part of the Saudi Arabian-led intervention in Yemen
Mali - MINUSMA
Syria - UNDOF, later captured by rebel groups, eventually captured by Syrian Army

See also
Other wheeled APCs and IFVs developed in South Africa
 Buffel
 Casspir
 Mamba APC
 Ratel IFV
 RCV-9
 RG-12
 RG-19
 RG-32
 RG-33
 RG-34
 RG-35

General
 Infantry Mobility Vehicle
 MRAP (armored vehicle)
 List of modern armoured fighting vehicles

References

Armoured personnel carriers of South Africa
Armoured fighting vehicles of Canada
BAE Systems land vehicles
Military trucks
United States Marine Corps equipment
Wheeled armoured personnel carriers